Les Rois du monde is a 2015 French drama film directed by Laurent Laffargue and co-written by Laffargue and Frédérique Moreau. It stars Sergi López, Céline Sallette, Eric Cantona, Romane Bohringer and Guillaume Gouix.

Cast 
 Sergi López as Jeannot
 Céline Sallette as Chantal
 Eric Cantona as Jacky
 Romane Bohringer as Marie-Jo
 Guillaume Gouix as Jean-François
 Victorien Cacioppo as Romain
 Roxane Arnal as Pascaline
 Jean-Baptiste Sagory as Thibault

References

External links 
 

2015 films
2015 drama films
2010s French-language films
French drama films
2015 directorial debut films
2010s French films